Beta Ceti (β Ceti, abbreviated Beta Cet, β Cet), officially named Diphda , is the brightest star in the constellation of Cetus. Although designated 'beta', it is actually brighter than the 'alpha' star in the constellation (Alpha Ceti). This orange giant is easy to identify due to its location in an otherwise dark section of the celestial sphere.

Properties 

Diphda has an apparent visual magnitude of 2.02, making it the brightest star in Cetus. The stellar classification of this star is K0 III, although some sources list a classification of G9.5 III indicating that it lies along the dividing line separating G-type from K-type stars. The luminosity class of 'III' means that it is a giant, a star that has consumed the hydrogen at its core and evolved away from the main sequence.  It was an A-type star when it formed on the main sequence more than a billion years ago. After passing through the red giant stage, it underwent a helium flash event and is now a red clump star generating energy through the thermonuclear fusion of helium at its core. Beta Ceti will remain in this mode for over 100 million years.

In spite of its cooler temperature, Diphda is much more luminous than the Sun with a bolometric luminosity of about 145 times that of the Sun, resulting from a radius 18 times as large as the Sun and a mass that is 2.8 times the Sun's mass.

This star displays flaring activity that results in random outbursts that increase the luminosity of the star over intervals lasting several days. This is a much longer duration than for comparable solar flare activity on the Sun, which typically last for periods measured in hours. In 2005, a relatively high rate of X-ray emission was detected with the XMM-Newton space observatory. It is emitting about 2,000 times the X-ray luminosity of the Sun, allowing the star to be imaged with the Chandra X-ray Observatory.

Nomenclature 

β Ceti (Latinised to Beta Ceti) is the star's Bayer designation.

It bore the traditional names Diphda and Deneb Kaitos . Diphda is Arabic for 'frog', from the phrase ضفدع الثاني aḍ-ḍifdaʿ aṯ-ṯānī 'the second frog' (the first frog' is Fomalhaut); Deneb Kaitos is from الذنب القيتوس الجنوب Al Dhanab al Ḳaiṭos al Janūbīyy 'southern tail of Cetus'.

In 2016, the International Astronomical Union organized a Working Group on Star Names (WGSN) to catalogue and standardize proper names for stars. The WGSN approved the name Diphda for this star on 21 August 2016 and it is now so entered in the IAU Catalog of Star Names.

In Chinese astronomy, Deneb Kaitos is called 土司空, Pinyin: Tǔsīkōng, meaning Master of Constructions, because this star is marking itself and stands alone in the Master of Constructions asterism, Legs mansion (see : Chinese constellation). 土司空 (Tǔsīkōng), westernized into Too Sze Kung'' by R.H. Allen and the meaning is "Superintendent of Earthworks."

Namesake
USS Diphda (AKA-59) was a U.S. Navy ship.

References

External links 
 Beta Ceti: Giant Star's Corona Brightens with Age

Ceti, Beta
Cetus (constellation)
K-type giants
Diphda
Suspected variables
0188
004128
BD-18 0115
Ceti, 16
003419
0031